Little Accidents is a 2014 American drama film directed and written by Sara Colangelo, based on her own 2010 award-winning short film of same name. The film stars Elizabeth Banks, Boyd Holbrook, Chloë Sevigny, Jacob Lofland, and Josh Lucas. The film had its world premiere at 2014 Sundance Film Festival on January 22, 2014. The film was released on January 16, 2015 in a limited release by Amplify.

Plot
When a boy goes missing in a small town already devastated by a fatal mining accident, three strangers find themselves drawn together in a tangle of secrets, lies, and the collective grief of the community. Reeling from the disappearance of her son, Diane finds herself drifting away from her husband Amos, a mining company executive whose role in the accident has made her family the prime target for the town’s anger. When she forms a dangerous bond with the sole survivor of the disaster, truths will be uncovered that threaten to tear apart the few remaining threads holding the town together in this intense drama.

Cast
 Elizabeth Banks as Diana Doyle
 Boyd Holbrook as Amos Jenkins
 Chloë Sevigny as Kendra Briggs
 Josh Lucas as Bill Doyle
 Jacob Lofland as Owen Briggs
 Travis Tope as JT Doyle

Production
Production  began in the summer of 2013 in West Virginia. Anne Carey, Jason Michael Berman, Summer Shelton and Thomas B. Fore signed on to produce the film. Executive producers include Mike Feuer, Todd Feuer and Kwesi  from MindSmack Productions as well as Chris Columbus, Eleanor Columbus, Kwesi  and Ruth Mutch.

Release
The film had its world premiere at the Sundance Film Festival on January 22, 2014. The film went on to premiere at the Dallas International Film Festival, Sundance London Festival, San Francisco International Film Festival, Little Rock Film Festival, Seattle International Film Festival, Karlovy Vary Film Festival, Hamptons International Film Festival, San Diego Film Festival, Denver International Film Festival, Vienna International Film Festival, Napa Valley Film Festival. Amplify later acquired distribution rights to the film with a planned January 2015 release. The film was released on January 16, 2015, in a limited release and through video on demand.

References

External links

2014 films
2014 drama films
American drama films
Films scored by Marcelo Zarvos
Films shot in West Virginia
Features based on short films
Films produced by Anne Carey
2014 directorial debut films
2010s English-language films
2010s American films